This is a list of districts of England ordered by area, according to Standard Area Measurements published by the Office for National Statistics.

More than 1,000 km2

100–1,000 km2

Less than 100 km2

References

Districts by area
Districts of England
Demographics of England
Local government in England